The 6.5×54mm Mannlicher–Schönauer also known as 6.5×54 Mannlicher–Schönauer Greek or simply 6.5 Greek is a 6.5 mm (.264" cal.) rimless rifle cartridge used in the Mannlicher–Schönauer rifle. It is the direct descendant of the 6.5×53mmR rimmed cartridge from the 1891 Mannlicher rifle, designed to function smoothly through the Schönauer's rotary magazine. 6.5 mm bullets are typically known for their high ballistic coefficients and sectional density, which gives them great stability in flight, resistance to wind deflection, and high penetrating power.  It, along with the Mannlicher–Schönauer rifle, was first introduced in Paris at the 1900 World's Fair.

Hunting use

Walter Dalrymple Maitland "Karamojo" Bell, who shot more than 1,500 elephants in the period 1895-1930, had a very high regard for the 6.5mm Mannlicher–Schoenauer, using it for approximately 300 of these kills.  Daniel Fraser of Edinburgh, Scotland built him a special, lightweight rifle in that calibre.  He only set it aside when he was unable to acquire dependable ammunition for it, and turned to a .275 Rigby Mauser magazine rifle instead. The .275 Rigby cartridge is interchangeable with the 7×57mm Mauser.  Bell's legendary name has remained closely linked with the 7mm Mauser, but the 6.5 Mann.–Sch. was his first preference. 

The 6.5×54mm was referred to by the writer Ernest Hemingway as the .256 Mannlicher. Though it never replaced his favorite .30-06 Springfield, he did speak highly of it as a lion cartridge, and it was the favorite of his African guide and professional hunter Phillip Percival. The Kenya game warden and naturalist A. Blaney Percival also favored the 6.5×54mm.

In part, the 6.5×54mm's reputation stems from its use of a  bullet, giving the projectile very high sectional density and therefore penetrating ability. It requires a fast rate-of-twist rifling (about 1 in 9") to stabilize such a long bullet.

Military use

The 6.5×54mm Mannlicher–Schönauer cartridge was adopted by the Greek Army, along with the Mannlicher–Schönauer rifle in 1903. From 1906 until the German invasion and capitulation of Greece in April 1941, it was the standard military cartridge of the Greek Army. The Mannlicher-Carcano round was also used by Greek forces in this rifle, being with its cartridge just 2mm smaller than the desired bullet. During the German occupation it was used by Greek resistance fighters and during the Greek Civil War (1946 - 1949) by the Greek Gendarmerie, militia units and communist fighters of the Democratic Army of Greece. During the German occupation, Carcano rifles captured during World War II were also converted to 6.5×54mm Mannlicher–Schönauer and used by Greek forces.

The Austrian Army used the 6.5×54mm Mannlicher–Schönauer cartridge during World War I. Some  Austrian Army regiments and the Polish Legion, were armed with confiscated Mannlicher–Schönauer rifles produced for the Greek Army. Also the Austrian Army used the 6.5×54 Mannlicher–Schönauer cartridge in converted 6.5×50mm Arisaka rifles captured from the Russian Army.

See also
 6.5×53mmR - The rimmed Romanian and Dutch service rifle cartridge from the 1890s through World War II 
6.5×55mm Swedish
.260 Remington
 6.5×47mm Lapua - a 2005 cartridge that fires the same diameter and weight 9.0g bullet as the 6.5×54mm but achieves a faster muzzle velocity
6.5mm Creedmoor

References

See also
Mannlicher–Schönauer

Pistol and rifle cartridges
Military cartridges
Hellenic Army